Old Hill Wanderers Football Club was an English association football club based in Old Hill in the Black Country.  The club competed in the Birmingham & District League, one of the country's strongest semi-professional leagues, between 1892 and 1895, winning the league championship in the 1893–94 season.  The club also competed in the FA Cup on one occasion, but left the Birmingham League in 1895 and appears to have folded altogether. A crowd of around 4,000 saw the Wanderers draw 3–3 with Causeway Green Villa on 24 October 1891. The reporter said it was the highest attendance to date at the ground and that "never was a finer game played there". The Birmingham League Secretary, Arthur Cooknell, retrospectively attributed the club's downfall to it being the victim of its own success. The loss of quality players from the 1893–94 Birmingham League-winning side, such as Alec Leake and Billy Williams to Small Heath and West Bromwich Albion respectively, was a major factor in the decline of the club's fortunes. Unable to match the results of the title-winning season,  attendances declined and a financial loss for the 1894–95 season was reported. The landlord ordered the ground to be dismantled in August 1895 and the club became homeless.

References

Defunct football clubs in England
Defunct football clubs in the West Midlands (county)
Association football clubs disestablished in the 19th century
Association football clubs established in the 19th century
West Midlands (Regional) League